Tassybay Abdikarimov (Tasybaı Ábdikárimov; ; 1938 – 17 December 2020, Maktaaral District) was a Kazakh farmer and engineer, awarded with Virtus et Fraternitas Medal.

Abdikarimov grew up in a farmer family. After 1952, he has been helping the Jabłoński family: Amelia and her three children, including Walenty (born 1932). The Jabłońskis, eventually settled in the Pakhta-Aral sovkhoz in the village of Ilich, have been among Poles unvoluntary deported by the Soviet authorities to Kazakhstan, sharing their lives with the locals. Despite an extremely difficult situation – sanitary conditions, food shortage, and hard labor causing a high mortality rate among the inhabitants – Tassybay Abdikarimov has been helping the Jabłońskis to adapt, especially by providing food to the ill Walenty and rest of the family. He was also helping Walenty to hide his photo camera. Walenty, thanks to the medical education he had begun before the deportation, has been serving local community as physician, gaining recognition. In 1956, the Jabłońskis were allowed to return to Poland. They has been keeping in touch with Abdikarimov.

Later, Abdikarimov graduated from the Tashkent Institute of Irrigation and Melioration and worked in southern Kazakhstan as a farmer engineer. For many years he has been looking after the graves of Poles who died in Kazakhstan.

In appreciation of his effort, in 2019, Abdikarimov was awarded with Virtus et Fraternitas Medal. He received the honour from the President Andrzej Duda during the event at the Polish Theatre in Warsaw, in the presence of the Deputy Marshal of the Sejm Małgorzata Gosiewska, Deputy Prime Piotr Gliński, as well as Walenty Jabłoński.

See also 
 Poles in Kazakhstan

References 

1938 births
2020 deaths
Tashkent Institute of Irrigation and Agricultural Mechanization Engineers alumni
Kazakhstani engineers
Recipients of the Virtus et Fraternitas Medal